Tirymynach is a community in Ceredigion, Wales, also an electoral ward, which lies immediately to the north of Aberystwyth.

Tirymynach is represented in the Senedd by Elin Jones (Plaid Cymru) and the Member of Parliament is Ben Lake (Plaid Cymru).

This community includes the villages of Bow Street, Clarach, Dole, Llangorwen and Pen-y-garn.
The area of the community is roughly 15 square km.

References

See also
List of localities in Wales by population

Villages in Ceredigion